Micrantheum is a genus of plants under the family Picrodendraceae described as a genus in 1818. It is endemic to Australia.

Species 
 Micrantheum demissum F.Muell. - South Australia
 Micrantheum ericoides Desf. - New South Wales, Queensland
 Micrantheum hexandrum Hook.f.  - Box Micrantheum  - New South Wales, Queensland, Victoria, Tasmania
 Micrantheum serpentinum Orchard - Western Tridentbush - Tasmania

See also
Taxonomy of the Picrodendraceae

References

Picrodendraceae
Endemic flora of Australia
Malpighiales genera